Manu is one of the 60 Legislative Assembly constituencies of Tripura state in India. It is in South Tripura district and is reserved for candidates belonging to the Scheduled Tribes. The current MLA is Pravat Chaudhury of CPIM.

Members of Legislative Assembly
1993: Jitendra Choudhury, Communist Party of India (Marxist)
1998: Jitendra Choudhury, Communist Party of India (Marxist)
2003: Jitendra Choudhury, Communist Party of India (Marxist)
2008: Jitendra Choudhury, Communist Party of India (Marxist)
2013: Jitendra Choudhury, Communist Party of India (Marxist)
2014: Pravat Chowdhury, Communist Party of India (Marxist)

Election results

2018

See also
South Tripura district
 Mandaibazar constituency
 Hrishyamukh constituency
 List of constituencies of the Tripura Legislative Assembly

References

Assembly constituencies of Tripura
South Tripura district